Masaki Watanabe (渡邉 将基, born December 2, 1986) is a Japanese football player who plays as a defender for Terengganu FC II.

Club statistics
Updated to 23 February 2018.

References

External links

Profile at Ventforet Kofu
Profile at Yokohama FC

1986 births
Living people
Kyoto Sangyo University alumni
Association football people from Kyoto Prefecture
Japanese footballers
J1 League players
J2 League players
Malaysia Super League players
Sagan Tosu players
Yokohama FC players
Giravanz Kitakyushu players
Ventforet Kofu players
FC Gifu players
Perlis FA players
Felda United F.C. players
Association football defenders